The 2016 County Championship (known for sponsorship reasons as the 2016 Specsavers County Championship), was the 117th cricket County Championship season. It was announced in March 2016 that the 2017 season would feature only eight teams in Division One, meaning that only one team would be promoted from Division Two in the 2016 season, whilst two teams were relegated from Division One.

The season saw a significant change in playing regulations where instead of a mandatory coin toss to determine choice of batting or bowling first, the visiting team was allowed to choose to bowl first if they desired. This change was introduced by the ECB cricket committee in November 2015 as a response to concerns raised about the standard of pitches, particularly in Division Two of the Championship. The initiative attempted to reduce the preparation of seamer friendly wickets which had seen matches completed quickly, made batting harder early in matches and generally gave an advantage to the side bowling first. By encouraging Counties to produce more balanced wickets the initiative aimed to promote the skills required in Test cricket, in particular aiding the development of spin bowling and promoting more patient batting.

Tougher penalties for poor pitches and the use of the new regulations just in Division Two of the Championship had been considered by the ECB, but the committee opted to implement the change across both divisions in 2016. On the opening day of the 2016 season, four captains opted to bowl first with the choice of batting or bowling being decided by a toss in just one match.

Teams
The 2016 Championship was divided into two divisions of nine teams each. Each county played every other side in their division twice with matches lasting four days - once at home and once away. At the end of the season one county was promoted from Division Two and two relegated from Division One in order to create a smaller Division One and a bigger Division Two in 2017.

Division One
 Team promoted from Division Two

Division Two
 Team relegated from Division One

Standings
Teams receive 16 points for a win, 8 for a tie and 5 for a draw. Bonus points (a maximum of 5 batting points and 3 bowling points) may be scored during the first 110 overs of each team's first innings.

Division One

Division Two

Fixtures
The fixture list for the 2016 season was announced in December 2015.

Division One

April

May

June

July

August

September

Division Two

April

May

June

July

August

September

Statistics

Division One

Most runs

Most wickets

Division Two

Most runs

Most wickets

References

2016
County Championship